Robert M. Keating  (September 22, 1862 – January 19, 1922), was a Major League Baseball pitcher for the Baltimore Orioles. He appeared in one game for the Orioles on August 27, 1887—pitching a complete game, allowing 16 runs on 16 hits in the loss. An arm injury ended his career and he became an inventor, starting off by inventing various shaving devices.

In 1897, he started the R.M. Keating Company that manufactured bicycles, through his Keating Wheel Works subsidiary. Keating had some success for a time with his bicycle business and may even have invented the first motorcycle, though the company apparently folded before any were released.

He also invented the rubber home plate, still in use today.

External links

Robert Keating, inventor

1862 births
1922 deaths
Major League Baseball pitchers
Baltimore Orioles (AA) players
Baseball players from Massachusetts
19th-century baseball players
19th-century American engineers